Heredero is the first TAPE Inc. drama series broadcast on RPN 9 from July 23, 1984 to September 4, 1987. Heredero depicts the climax of an age-old battle between immortal warriors, depicted through elaborately interwoven past and present-day storylines.

Cast
 Philip Gamboa
 Manilyn Reynes
 Helen Vela
 Richard Arellano
 Glaiza Herradura
 Luz Fernandez
 King Gutierrez
 Bembol Roco
 Augusto Victa as Padre Jose

See also
List of programs previously broadcast by Radio Philippines Network

References

External links

Philippine drama television series
1984 Philippine television series debuts
1987 Philippine television series endings
Radio Philippines Network original programming
1980s Philippine television series
Television series by TAPE Inc.
Filipino-language television shows